The Way I Feel Today may refer to:
 The Way I Feel Today (Six by Seven album)
 The Way I Feel Today (Stan Ridgway album)